Coralliozetus angelicus, the Angel blenny, is a species of chaenopsid blenny found in coral reefs from the Gulf of California to Acapulco, Mexico, in the eastern central Pacific ocean. It can reach a maximum length of  TL. This species feeds primarily on zooplankton.

References
 Böhlke, J. E. and G. W. Mead 1957 (26 July) A new blenny from the coast of western Mexico. Notulae Naturae (Philadelphia) No. 301: 1–8, Pl. 1.

angelicus
Fish of Mexican Pacific coast
Fish described in 1957